Jonno Davies (born 17 July 1992) is an English actor born in Chesterfield, best known in the UK and US for his role as Alex DeLarge in the stage production of A Clockwork Orange. In 2020, he appeared in the Amazon Prime series Hunters as Tobias. In May 2022 it was announced that Davies had been cast as British singer Robbie Williams in Better Man, a forthcoming biopic on the adult life of Williams, due for release at the end of 2023, directed by Michael Gracey.

Education
Davies trained at the Italia Conti Academy of Theatre Arts, graduating in 2013. He was Italia Conti's nominee at the Spotlight Prize competition in his final year.

Career
Davies portrayed the lead role of Alex DeLarge in Action to the Word's all-male stage adaptation of A Clockwork Orange. He was initially cast only for the show's tours of Norway and Singapore, in 2014 and 2015 respectively.

The announcement that A Clockwork Orange was to be staged in Singapore generated considerable media interest, as all theatre productions of Anthony Burgess' dystopian classic had been banned in the city-state for over 30 years. Much of the show's promotion and marketing concentrated on the production's all-male cast, and Davies' muscular physique hadn't gone unnoticed, with 8 Days Magazine featuring him as their Shirtless Guy of the Week in the run-up to the show opening at the Esplanade Theatre on 4 November 2015. The Singaporean edition of Esquire Magazine also ran a four-page interview with Davies.

Davies revived the role during the show's run at Park Theatre, London in February and March 2017 to enthusiastic reviews. Debbie Gilpin of Broadway World described his portrayal as "without doubt this is one of the standout lead performances of the year so far" and Jane Kemp of WhatsOnStage.com commented "Alex is played with brutal splendour by Jonno Davies". The show transferred to the New World Stages theatre, off Broadway, New York in September 2017 with Davies, making his US stage debut, leading a new, all-American supporting cast.

Whilst in New York, Davies modelled for several fashion designers and clothing manufacturers, including Loris Diran, Florshiem, Scarci and Cego.

In addition to performing in A Clockwork Orange, Davies played the title role in Dracula at the Edinburgh Festival Fringe in 2014 and was also a cast member of the Olivier Award-nominated production of Shakespeare in Love at the Noel Coward Theatre in London's West End in 2015.

In June 2019, it was announced that Jonno Davies had been added to the cast of the then-forthcoming Amazon Prime series The Hunt (subsequently renamed Hunters), starring Al Pacino. Davies played the character Tobias in the series.

Davies has appeared in several TV series and films, including Kingsman: The Secret Service as Lee Unwin, Casualty, Spotless, Silent Witness, Hollyoaks and Doctors. He plays the role of Andrew King in the British cyber-crime thriller King of Crime.

In late 2020 Davies provided the voiceover for Aunt Bessie's 'Caring Is The Hardest Thing We Do' TV advertising campaign.

As guest lead in the first episode of series five of BBC1's TV series Shakespeare and Hathaway, Davies played tech-entrepreneur Bertie Talk in 2022.

Personal life
He has been in a relationship with actress Rachel Bright, best known for playing Poppy Meadow in EastEnders, since 2014. They were due to be married in October 2020 but the wedding was postponed on three occasions due to coronavirus restrictions. The couple were finally married at the fourth attempt at The Groucho Club in London on 10 July 2021. In June 2021, Davies and Bright both appeared together in an episode of Holby City playing Leo Powell and Beth Miller respectively.

Filmography

References

External links
 
 

1992 births
21st-century English male actors
Actors from Chesterfield, Derbyshire
Male actors from Derbyshire
English male film actors
English male stage actors
English male television actors
Living people
People educated at Bedford School